Antiphilus is an ancient Greek male name. It can refer to any of the following:

 Antiphilus, ancient Greek painter
 Antiphilus, ancient Greek mentioned by Pausanias as the architect of the treasury of the Carthaginians at Olympia 
 Antiphilus, Athenian general appointed as the successor of Leosthenes in the Lamian War in 323 BCE, and gained a victory over Leonnatus
 Antiphilus of Byzantium, a writer of epigrams